Breabach is a Scottish folk music band formed in 2005. In 2011, they received nominations for ‘Best Group’ at the BBC Radio 2 Folk Awards. They won Scottish Folk Band of the Year in 2012 and Live Act of the Year in 2013 at the Scots Trad Music Awards (Na Trads).

Members 
Calum MacCrimmon – pipes, whistles, bouzouki, vocals
MacCrimmon graduated with honours from the Royal Scottish Academy of Music and Drama. He is currently a member of Breabach, Mans Ruin, The Unusual Suspects, Seudan and RTK9000. From 2004 to 2008 he was acting musical co-director/accompanist/tutor for The National Youth Pipe Band of Scotland.
Megan Henderson – fiddle, vocals
Henderson is from Fort William. She is involved with the Feisean movement, playing at festivals including Celtic Colours, Canada, Celtic Connections, Scotland and Blas, also in Scotland. Henderson moved to Glasgow in 2007 to study at the Royal Scottish Academy of Music and Drama. She currently plays with Salsa Celtica.
Ewan Robertson – guitar, cajon, vocals
Robertson became interested in guitar and song whilst studying at Sgoil Chiùil na Gàidhealtachd.  He was awarded the BBC Radio Scotland Young Traditional Musician award in 2008.
James Lindsay – double bass, vocals
Lindsay comes from Inverurie in the heart of Aberdeenshire. He graduated with Honours in 2011 from Strathclyde University in Glasgow with a BA Applied Music degree. He combines playing with the band and working as a session musician.
Conal McDonagh - pipes, whistles, vocals

Past members

James Duncan Mackenzie – pipes, flute, whistles
Mackenzie is from Back in the Isle of Lewis. He has a BA(Hons) in Scottish Music, specializing in piping at the Royal Scottish Academy of Music and Drama. He played with the ScottishPower Pipe Band for two years.
Patsy Reid - Fiddle, viola, and cello
Reid is from Perthshire.

Discography

Studio albums 
 The Big Spree (2007)
 The Desperate Battle of the Birds (2010)
 Bann (2012)
 Ùrlar (2013)
 Astar (2016)
 Frenzy of the Meeting (2018)
 Dùsgadh (2021) Soundtrack album to the animated film Dùsgadh 
 Fàs (2022)

Performances 
The band has performed at events such as Fairport's Cropredy Convention, Isle of Skye Music Festival, Shrewsbury Folk Festival, the Edinburgh Fringe and WOMAD. It has received reviews in numerous publications including Songlines, fRoots and The Scotsman.

References

External links

Breabach discover a new way of bonding, The Herald article detailing early history and membership of the band

Scottish folk music groups
Vertical Records artists
Scottish Gaelic music